Clerical may refer to:

 Pertaining to the clergy
 Pertaining to a clerical worker
 Clerical script, a style of Chinese calligraphy
 Clerical People's Party

See also 
 Cleric (disambiguation)
 Clerk (disambiguation)